Sarah-Jane Crawford is an English television and radio presenter, actress, voice-over artist, and DJ best known for her radio work with Hits Radio and formerly with BBC Radio 1Xtra, and television work with E! Network (which she is currently a host for), ITV2 on The Xtra Factor, BBC and Channel 4. Crawford has also presented and appeared a number of shows for the Disney Channel and MTV.
Crawford has been a vegan since 2015 and released a vegan app called Viappi in November 2017.

Early life
Born in Lambeth to birth parents of Irish and Caribbean descent, she was adopted at two months old. She attended schools at Bessemer Grange, Dulwich Hamlet and Sydenham Girls' School before moving up to Cambridgeshire for her remaining years of secondary school. Before becoming a television presenter, Crawford went to Kingston University and Anglia Ruskin University. She graduated with a 2:1 degree in marketing.

Career

Television
Crawford began her TV career on Shipwrecked 3 on Channel 4, but began presenting in 2007 when she hosted the Red Carpet and Back Stage show of the Vodafone Live Music Awards for The Hits music video channel, now known as 4music.

In 2007, Crawford joined the presenter line-up for the E4 Music Zone and Freshly Squeezed for Channel 4 and as a result she has interviewed the likes of Robert De Niro, Usher, Nicole Scherzinger, the Pussycat Dolls, Natasha Bedingfield, will.i.am, Colin Farrell, Kate Hudson, Ewan McGregor, Jerry Seinfeld, Sarah Jessica Parker and Renée Zellweger for Channel 4.

On 25 July 2008, Crawford was the celebrity guest on eviction night for Big Brother's Big Mouth and for Big Brother's Little Brother, on 18 August 2008. In October 2009, Crawford officially launched the UK MTV channel VIVA, the first channel from MTV. In August 2010, Crawford began hosting a weekly show on MTV HD's channel called The Music Alphabet. In September 2010, Crawford appeared with Jonathan Ross and Ant and Dec, on the Nintendo TV advertisement celebrating 25 years of Mario.

In July 2013, she co-hosted the BBC Three coverage of T in the Park festival with Greg James. In August 2013 Crawford co-hosted BBC Three's first Urban Classic Prom at the Royal Albert Hall with Charlie Sloth. In October 2013, she co-hosted the Mobo Awards with Trevor Nelson which aired on BBC One and BBC Three.

In December 2013, Crawford appeared as one of the celebrity panelists for four episodes of I'm a Celebrity get me out of here now, on ITV2.  On 30 August 2014, Crawford replaced Caroline Flack and Matt Richardson as the presenter of The X Factor's ITV2 spin-off show The Xtra Factor.

In October 2014 Crawford hosted the MOBO awards with Spice Girl Mel B on ITV2.

In February 2015 Crawford began presenting duties for E! Network by hosting the BAFTA red carpet show. In June 2015, Crawford launched a show to help E! find a new UK and Ireland online host.

In November 2015, she hosted the Mobo Awards for the third time at the First Direct Arena in Leeds. In December 2016 - January 2017, Crawford co-hosted World's Strongest Man for Channel 5.
Crawford co-hosted her second series of World's Strongest Man in 2017 due to air on Channel 5 during December to January 2018. Crawford took part in series 3 of Celebs Go Dating which aired on E4 in September 2017.

On 19 May 2018, Crawford was a co-presenter of E!’s royal wedding coverage of Prince Harry and Meghan Markle's wedding live from Windsor Castle alongside Giuliana Rancic, Melanie Bromley and Brad Goreski. This telecast was broadcast live in both the US and UK and repeated throughout the next 12 hours afterwards. E!’s coverage was broadcast on their local networks globally. As well as this Crawford appeared in a number of specials about the royal wedding for broadcast on E! in the US which were later aired in the UK in the week leading up to the ceremony.

Radio
In October 2008, Crawford began presenting on ad hoc shows as a cover DJ on BBC Radio 1Xtra. In April 2009, she began hosting her own show which was the early weekend breakfast slot from 7.00 am on BBC Radio 1Xtra In 2011, Crawford began hosting the Saturday and Sunday slot from 1.00 pm to 4.00 pm, upon which she launched BBC Radio 1Xtra's first Book Club. From 2 April 2012, she started to present the weekday afternoon slot on BBC Radio 1Xtra.

On 11 September 2012, Crawford appeared on BBC Radio 1's Innuendo Bingo. Crawford has stood in for Aled Jones on occasions to present the Surgery on BBC Radio 1 and in January 2014, she co-hosted a special show on 'Happiness' with him.

On 8 March 2014, she kick-started a marathon on Radio 1 and 1xtra of one-off special takeover shows for International Women's day by hosting the 7–9 pm slot on radio 1. Crawford depped for MistaJam on Radio 1 on the 7-9 pm slot to host a special warm-up show for Glastonbury festival.

Crawford has since covered for Gemma Cairney who currently presents the Surgery and on 12 August 2015 hosted a A-level results advisory show. In 2015 Crawford has also covered on BBC Radio 1, Saturday and Sundays from 1 pm to 4 pm On 1 October 2015, Crawford hosted her last show for BBC Radio 1Xtra after an announcement by her earlier the previous month that she was leaving to work on TV projects in Los Angeles.

Crawford joined Bauer media's new national station Hits Radio in June 2018 to present weeknights 7-10pm, she also presented The Hits Radio Top 40 Sunday's 4-7pm which later became known as The UK Chart Show. As of Monday 24 June 2019, Crawford took over the 1-4pm afternoon slot on the station in addition to presenting the chart. She was replaced on evenings by Jordan Lee.
Crawford now presents 4-7pm every weekend, and occasionally stands in for regular presenters.

Films
In 2013 Crawford starred in the British movie It's A lot which had its UK cinema release in October 2013. She played the part of single mother Lorna. In July 2016 Crawford starred in the film The Hatton Garden Job played the part of DCI Emma Carter alongside Matthew Goode, Joely Richardson and Larry Lamb. Made in 2016, the film was released in April 2017.

Modelling
Crawford appeared in the April 2008 issue of FHM and in the November 2008 issue of British Vogue as part of a photo shoot and article called "Top of the Box" with Lauren Laverne and Fiona Bruce. In early 2013, Crawford signed to Models 1, as part of their Special Bookings. In January 2014, Crawford appeared on the covers of Black Hair magazine and The Sun's Fabulous magazine twice in 2014.

She appeared on the cover of Pride magazine in 2014.
In June 2015 Crawford became the face of Brazilian flip flop brand Ipanema for a summer campaign. In September 2015 Crawford signed to Select Model Management to their celebrity division.

See also
 List of vegans

References

External links
 Sarah-Jane Crawford Official Website
 Sarah-Jane Crawford on Hits Radio
 The UK Chart Show on Hits Radio

Living people
1981 births
21st-century women musicians
Alumni of Anglia Ruskin University
Alumni of Kingston University
Black British DJs
Black British radio presenters
British adoptees
English radio DJs
English television presenters
BBC Radio 1Xtra presenters
English people of Guyanese descent
English people of Irish descent
People from Lambeth
Select Model Management models
Women DJs
British radio presenters
British women radio presenters